Olive Branch Precinct is located in Alexander County, Illinois, United States. As of the 2020 census, its population was 647.

Geography 

Demographics 
As of the 2020 census there were 647 people, 212 households, and 161 families residing in the precinct. The racial makeup of the precinct was 91.04% White, 0.15% African American, 0.46% Native American, 0.00% Asian, 0.00% Pacific Islander, 0.31% from other races, and 8.04% from two or more races. Hispanic or Latino of any race were 0.93% of the population.

There were 212 households, out of which 28.30% had children under the age of 18 living with them, 59.43% were married couples living together, 10.38% had a female householder with no spouse present, and 24.06% were non-families. 23.10% of all households were made up of individuals, and 20.80% had someone living alone who was 65 years of age or older. The average household size was 2.85 and the average family size was 3.42.

The precinct's age distribution consisted of 25.1% under the age of 18, 4.3% from 18 to 24, 19.8% from 25 to 44, 32% from 45 to 64, and 18.8% who were 65 years of age or older. The median age was 45.2 years. For every 100 females, there were 75.9 males. For every 100 females age 18 and over, there were 71.6 males.

The median income for a household in the precinct was $46,786, and the median income for a family was $47,411. Males had a median income of $31,929 versus $39,583 for females. The per capita income for the precinct was $18,649. About 19.3% of families and 24.0% of the population were below the poverty line, including 32.2% of those under age 18 and 17.5% of those age 65 or over.

References 

Precincts in Alexander County, Illinois